McCaughan is a surname of Irish origin. It is an Anglicised form of the Irish language Mac Eacháin, meaning "son of Eachán". The personal name Eachán is diminutive of the personal name Eachaidh, which is derived from each, meaning "horse".

People
Patrick Kinney McCaughan – (1844-1903) – New Zealand politician.
Charles McCaughan – American – actor and director.
Chris McCaughan – (born 1977) – American –  guitarist and vocalist in the band The Lawrence Arms.
Darren McCaughan – American baseball player
Mac McCaughan – founding member of the rock band Superchunk, and co-founder of Merge Records.

References

Anglicised Irish-language surnames
Patronymic surnames